Cass Township is a township in Jones County, Iowa.

History
Cass Township was organized in 1852.

References

Populated places in Jones County, Iowa
Townships in Iowa